The women's artistic individual all-around competition of the gymnastics events at the 2006 Central American and Caribbean Games was held on July 17–18 in Cartagena, Colombia.

Final

Qualification

References

2006 Central American and Caribbean Games
Central American and Caribbean Games
Gymnastics at the 2006 Central American and Caribbean Games